616 Elly is a minor planet orbiting the Sun. It is a member of the Maria family of asteroids.

References

External links 
 Lightcurve plot of 616 Elly, Palmer Divide Observatory, B. D. Warner (2010)
 Asteroid Lightcurve Database (LCDB), query form (info )
 Dictionary of Minor Planet Names, Google books
 Asteroids and comets rotation curves, CdR – Observatoire de Genève, Raoul Behrend
 Discovery Circumstances: Numbered Minor Planets (1)-(5000) – Minor Planet Center
 
 

Maria asteroids
Elly
Elly
S-type asteroids (Tholen)
19061017